Boconó is one of the 20 municipalities of the state of Trujillo, Venezuela. The municipality occupies an area of 1,365 km2 with a population of 100,240 inhabitants according to the 2011 census.

Parishes
The municipality consists of the following 12 parishes, with the seat of each in parentheses:

 Ayacucho (Batatal)
 Boconó (Boconó)
 Burbusay (Burbusay)
 El Carmen (El Carmen) 
 General Rivas (Las Mesitas) 
 Guaramacal (Guaramacal) 
 Monseñor Jáuregui (Niquitao) 
 Mosquey (Mosquey) 
 Rafael Rangel (San Rafael) 
 San José (Tostós) 
 San Miguel (San Miguel) 
 Vega de Guaramacal (Vega de Guaramacal)

References

Municipalities of Trujillo (state)